Convicts is the only studio album by American hip hop duo the Convicts, consisted of rappers Lord 3-2 and Big Mike. It was released in 1991 through Rap-A-Lot Records. It features guest appearances from James Prince, Kim "Choice" Davis and Geto Boys. The album peaked at number 52 on the US Billboard Top R&B/Hip-Hop Albums.

Track listing 

Sampled credits
 Track 1 contains elements from "Get Me Back on Time, Engine #9" by Wilson Pickett
 Track 2 contains elements from "Get Off My Dick and Tell Yo Bitch to Come Here" by Ice Cube 
 Track 3 contains elements from "Brandy" by The O'Jays, "Son of Slide" by Slave, "Think (About It)" by Lyn Collins, "Give It Up or Turnit a Loose (Remix)" by James Brown
 Track 4 contains elements from "Damn" by The Nite-Liters
 Track 5 contains elements from "Three Little Birds" by Bob Marley & The Wailers, "In the Hole" by The Bar-Kays, "Be Alright" by Zapp 
 Track 6 contains elements from "Sing a Simple Song" by Sly & the Family Stone, "Uphill Peace of Mind" by Kid Dynamite, "UFO" by ESG, "Devil With the Bust" by Sound Experience, "The Traffic Cop (Dance)" by Bloodstone, "Popcorn With a Feeling" by James Brown, "Jam on the Groove" by Ralph MacDonald
 Track 7 contains elements from "One Man Band (Plays All Alone)" by Monk Higgins & The Specialties, "All Because" by Al Green 
 Track 8 contains elements from "Lawdy Mama" by Ernie K-Doe, "Gangsta Gangsta" and "Fuck tha Police" by N.W.A.
 Track 9 contains elements from "Funky Drummer" and "Funky President (People It's Bad)" by James Brown
 Track 10 contains elements from "Dance With the Devil" by Big Daddy Kane, "Kissing My Love" by Bill Withers
 Track 12 contains elements from "Inner City Blues (Make Me Wanna Holler)" by Marvin Gaye, "Movin'" by Brass Construction, "Good Old Music" by Funkadelic

Personnel 
Christopher Juel Barriere – main artist
Michael Barnett – main artist
James A. Smith – featured artist (tracks: 5, 6), producer, executive producer, management
Geto Boys – featured artists (track 6)
Kim Davis – featured artist (track 7)
Collins "DJ Ready Red" Leysath – scratches
Doug King – producer
John Okuribido – producer
Johnny C – producer
Simon Cullins – producer
Cliff Blodget – executive producer
Tony Randle – production coordinator, management

Charts

References

External links 

1991 debut albums
Big Mike albums
Rap-A-Lot Records albums